Carlo Cesar (born ) is a Dutch male former track cyclist, who represented the Netherlands at international competitions. He competed at the 2016 UEC European Track Championships in the team sprint event and keirin event.

In December 2016 he competed at the Dutch National Championships Track Cycling, where he won gold on the kilometer time trial event.

In January 2018 he quit professional track cycling and started working for the KNWU, the Dutch Cycling Federation.

References

External links

Official Website

1992 births
Living people
Dutch male cyclists
Dutch track cyclists
Place of birth missing (living people)
21st-century Dutch people